The 1980 Soviet Chess Championship was the 48th edition of USSR Chess Championship. Held from 25 December 1980 to 21 January 1981 in Vilnius. The title was won by  Alexander Beliavsky and Lev Psakhis. Semifinals took place in Dnipropetrovsk, Krasnodar, Krasnoyarsk e Tallinn; The First League (also qualifying to the final) wad held at Tashkent.

Qualifying

Semifinals 
The qualifying Swiss was now split into four sections of 16 players all-play-alls, perhaps a
reflection of the unpopularity of the Swiss system in Soviet circles. All four, at Dnipropetrovsk, Krasnodar, Krasnoyarsk and Tallinn, took place simultaneously in August 1980. The winners respectively were Evgeni Vasiukov, Smbat Lputian, Lev Psakhis and Valery Chekhov gaining a direct promotion to the final.

First League 
The top seven qualified for the final.

Final 

The date of the final slipped, as it did not begin at the Lithuanian capital of Vilnius until December 25th. Not really Christmas Day, in a sense, since this
feast was not celebrated in the USSR. The delay was due to the 1980 Olympiad being played late in the year.

References 

USSR Chess Championships
Chess
1980 in chess
Chess